Ölziisaikhany Batzul (born 1 August 1994) is a Mongolian wrestler.

Major results

References

External links
 

Mongolian male sport wrestlers
1994 births
Living people
21st-century Mongolian people
Wrestlers at the 2018 Asian Games